Anjali Singh was a 20-year-old Indian woman who was killed in a road traffic collision in Delhi on January 1, 2023. It is also known as the 2023 Delhi hit-and-run case, or the Kanjhawala case.  Anjali was driving a scooter that was hit by a car, her leg got stuck in the car's axle and she was dragged by the car for several kilometres, eventually resulted in her death.  The incident generated widespread national and international coverage and was widely condemned, both in India and abroad. Subsequently, public protests against the central government for failing to provide adequate security for women took place in Delhi.

Anjali Singh 
Singh was born to mother Rekha as the second of six siblings who lived in the Mangolpuri area of Delhi. Her father died eight years before her death in 2023.  Singh's mother worked as an assistant in a school but lost her job during the COVID-19 pandemic. Singh did not complete school in order to financially support her family and worked as a make-up artist.  She was very active on social media and Instagram Reels. Anjali used to work as an usher for an event management company at weddings for daily remuneration.

Death 
Anjali left Vivan Palace OYO hotel at around 1:30 am on the morning of January 1, 2023, along with her friend Nidhi after attending a New Year's party. Anjali was wearing a pink T-shirt and Nidhi a red one. The five accused had first gone to Haryana's Murthal for a dhaba food to mark the New Year 2023. When travelling on her scooter in the Sultanpuri area of Delhi, she was struck by a grey Suzuki Baleno car. The car's five occupants panicked and did not stop, dragging the body of Singh for several kilometres. The car's occupants, who admitted being intoxicated with alcohol, were subsequently arrested. Her friend, Nidhi, was the scooter's pillion rider, but she escaped unharmed.

The naked body of Anjali was found near Hanuman Mandir at Jonti village in Sultanpuri. Her body was sent to the Sanjay Gandhi Memorial Hospital, Mangolpuri, Delhi.  An autopsy recorded the cause of Singh's death as "shock and haemorrhage due to injury to the head, spine, left femur and both lower limbs" and noted 40 injuries on her body.

Investigation
A medical board of doctors at the Maulana Azad Medical College (MAMC) conducted Anjali's autopsy and reported that there were a total of 40 injuries. The autopsy report mentioned Brain Matter Missing, Skull Open and Spine Broken. Her autopsy has ruled out the possibility of a sex assault. Delhi Police arrested the five accused within 3 hours of the body being found, with the help of two Automatic number-plate recognition (ANPR) cameras that captured the Baleno with the registration DL8CAY6414. The five accused men arrested are Amit Khanna (25), Krishan (27), Mithun (26) , Manoj Mittal (27) and Deepak Khanna (26). They were intoxicated at the time of the incident. Of the five, Manoj Mittal is affiliated to the Bharatiya Janata Party (BJP) and is co-convener of the Mongolpuri ward. Amit works with SBI Cards in Uttam Nagar, Krishan  works at the Spanish Culture Centre in Connaught Place, Mithun  is a hairdresser at Naraina, Manoj Mittal is a ration dealer in Sultanpuri while Deepak is a Gramin Sewa auto driver.

CCTV footage has emerged, which shows the girl being dragged under a Maruti Suzuki Baleno. The video is from January 1, 2023 at 2:13 AM shortly after the accident. According to an eye-witness, Deepak Dahiya, who runs a confectionary shop at the Kanjhawala Road in Ladpur village, the car took a U-turn after hitting the scooty. Deepak chased the car with his motorcycle and was in contact with the police. Anjali's friend Nidhi gave statement that the accused kept on driving the car deliberately while Anjali was screaming. Nidhi also said that Anjali was drunk on that day and Anjali insisted on driving the scooty.

On 5 January 2023, Delhi Police named two more accused - Ashutosh and Ankush Khanna. Ashutosh is the brother-in-law of the vehicle owner Lokesh, while Ankush is the brother of one of the accused. Ankush was later granted bail on furnishing a personal bond of  20,000 along with one surety. None of the four men in the car had driving license. Delhi police added section 201 of the Indian Penal Code to the FIR for ‘destruction of evidence’. It was Amit Khanna who was allegedly driving the car while Deepak Khanna (a cousin of Ankush and Amit Khanna) was at his house at the time of the accident. Nidhi was caught by Government Railway Police (GRP), Agra, in 2020 in a drug case under Narcotic Drugs and Psychotropic Substances Act, 1985, in which she later got bail. Delhi Police has also found traffic challans worth  19000 pending against Nidhi. Another CCTV footage showed Anjali in another accident on 16 July 2022. That time Anjali has consumed alcohol.

Ministry of Home Affairs asked the Delhi Police to invoke Section 302 of the IPC against the accused persons.

Aftermath 
Singh's family have made claims that she was the subject of a sexual assault due to her body being found naked. Police have rejected this allegation stating that the post-mortem examination did not support the allegation.

On 3 January 2023, a delegation of 12 Aam Aadmi Party legislators- led by Greater Kailash MLA Saurabh Bhardwaj along with Kalkaji MLA Atishi, met Delhi Police commissioner Sanjay Arora and submitted a memorandum with five demands. The demands included the removal of deputy commissioner of police (outer) Harendra K Singh. Delhi Chief Minister Arvind Kejriwal announced financial assistance of Rs 10 lakh to the victim's family. Former IPS officer Kiran Bedi said the current police response system in Delhi has collapsed and called for a need for the revival of the earlier police response system through police control room vans. Delhi Commission for Women chairperson Swati Maliwal cautioned against “victim-shaming” of Anjali and said that her friend's account should be verified. Shah Rukh Khan‘s Meer Foundation has extended financial aid to Delhi accident victim Anjali Singh’s family.

On Ministry of Home Affairs's recommendations, 11 Delhi policemen were suspended.

References

Singh, Anjali
January 2023 events in India
Deaths by person in India
Road incident deaths in India